Schmiditellus is an extinct genus of holmiid trilobites from the Cambrian of Poland. As of 2017, a Schmidtiellus reetae fossil from 530 mya, collected in Saviranna in northern Estonia, is the oldest known fossilized eye. The structure is similar to the compound eyes of modern-day dragonflies and bees, but with (~100) ommatidia spaced further apart, and without a lens.

References

Cambrian trilobites
Olenelloidea
Fossil taxa described in 1906